Curetis, the sunbeams, is a genus of gossamer-winged butterflies (Lycaenidae) from Southeast Asia. They are presently the only genus in the subfamily Curetinae.

Selected species
 Curetis acuta - angled sunbeam
 Curetis acuta formosana Fruhstorfer, 1908
 Curetis brunnea Wileman, 1909
 Curetis barsine Felder, 1860
 Curetis bulis - bright sunbeam
 Curetis dentata - toothed sunbeam
 Curetis discalis Moore, 1879
 Curetis felderi Distant, 1884
 Curetis freda Eliot, 1959
 Curetis honesta Fruhstorfer, 1908
 Curetis insularis (Horsfield, 1829)
 Curetis latipicta Fruhstorfer, 1908
 Curetis minima Distant & Pryer, 1887
 Curetis naga Evans, 1954
 Curetis nesophila C. & R. Felder, 1862
 Curetis nisias Fruhstorfer, 1908
 Curetis regula
 Curetis santana
 Curetis saronis - Burmese sunbeam
 Curetis semilimbata Fruhstorfer, 1908
 Curetis siva - Shiva's sunbeam
 Curetis sperthis (C. & R. Felder, 1865)
 Curetis tagalica (C. & R. Felder, 1862) 
 Curetis thetis - Indian sunbeam
 Curetis tonkina Evans, 1954
 Curetis venata Fruhstorfer, 1908

External links
Curetis at Markku Savela's website on Lepidoptera
 Images representing Curetis  at BOLD

 
Lycaenidae genera
Taxa named by Jacob Hübner